Edward Wyatt Gould (18 May 1879 - 9 February 1960) was a Welsh rugby union player who also represented Britain at the 1908 Summer Olympics. Gould captained his club side, Newport RFC, for a single season, and is best known as the younger brother of Welsh rugby superstar Arthur "Monkey" Gould

Sporting career

Rugby
Gould came from a notable sporting family from Newport in South Wales, his father, Joseph Gould, was a keen sportsman and played cricket for the local team. Five of Wyatt's brothers played rugby for Newport, one of the most prolific clubs in the country. Of the six brothers, three were capped at an international level, all for Wales; they were Bob, Bert and most famously Arthur "Monkey" Gould. Arthur and Bob both captained Wales and like Wyatt also captained Newport, though Wyatt never reached the level of international rugby achieved by his brothers.

Gould joined Newport in 1899 and played most of his career at wing, playing opposite to Wales wing players Teddy Morgan and Johnnie Williams. In the 1905/06 season Gould was selected to captain the senior Newport team, but he only played five games during the period, with Charlie Pritchard taking over the captaincy duties while Gould was absent. Gould left Newport in 1907, but continued his association with Newport as a club official for many years.

Athletics
As well as rugby, Gould was a keen athlete, and his specialised in the 120 yard hurdles. He came third in the Amateur Athletic Association 120 hurdles of 1903 and was Welsh 120 yard hurdles champion of 1902, 1903, 1905 and 1910. In 1908, Gould switched to the 440 yard hurdles in an attempt to win a place at the 1908 Summer Olympics. He qualified for the British team but although qualifying for the semi-finals he did not finish the race.

Bibliography

References

1879 births
1960 deaths
Welsh rugby union players
Newport RFC players
Rugby union wings
Athletes (track and field) at the 1908 Summer Olympics
Olympic athletes of Great Britain
Welsh male hurdlers
Rugby union players from Newport, Wales